Edward Schafer may refer to:

 Ed Schafer (born 1946), American politician
 Edward H. Schafer (1913–1991), American sinologist
 Edward Albert Sharpey-Schafer (1850–1935), formerly Edward Albert Schäfer, English physiologist